Ervaticine is a 2-acylindole alkaloid. It occurs in Ervatamia coronaria and Tabernaemontana divaricata.

See also 
Ervatinine
Isovoacangine
Vobasine

References 

Indole alkaloids